Joseph Netzer (born 20 February 1826 in Martelange; died 21 June 1901 in Arlon) was mayor of Arlon from 1880 until 1901. He was married to Élisabeth Delrez and the father of 6 children.

During his term the city hall on Rue Paul Reuter was thoroughly renovated. It was originally designed by Albert-Jean-Baptiste Jamot and had served as a boarding school from 1843 until 1896. On 29 September 1898 Netzer presided the council for the first time in the new city hall.

A street in Arlon was named after him.

He was buried in the Jewish section of the cemetery of Arlon.

References

1826 births
1901 deaths
Mayors of places in Belgium
People from Arlon
People from Martelange